In mathematics, the support (sometimes topological support or spectrum) of a measure  on a measurable topological space  is a precise notion of where in the space  the measure "lives".

Motivation

where the overbar denotes set closure. However, this definition is somewhat unsatisfactory: we use the notion of closure, but we do not even have a topology on  What we really want to know is where in the space  the measure  is non-zero. Consider two examples:
 Lebesgue measure  on the real line  It seems clear that  "lives on" the whole of the real line.
 A Dirac measure  at some point  Again, intuition suggests that the measure  "lives at" the point  and nowhere else.

In light of these two examples, we can reject the following candidate definitions in favour of the one in the next section:
 We could remove the points where  is zero, and take the support to be the remainder  This might work for the Dirac measure  but it would definitely not work for  since the Lebesgue measure of any singleton is zero, this definition would give  empty support.
 By comparison with the notion of strict positivity of measures, we could take the support to be the set of all points with a neighbourhood of positive measure:  (or the closure of this). It is also too simplistic: by taking  for all points  this would make the support of every measure except the zero measure the whole of 

However, the idea of "local strict positivity" is not too far from a workable definition.

Definition

Some authors prefer to take the closure of the above set. However, this is not necessary: see "Properties" below.

An equivalent definition of support is as the largest  (with respect to inclusion) such that every open set which has non-empty intersection with  has positive measure, i.e. the largest  such that:

Signed and complex measures

This definition can be extended to signed and complex measures. 
Suppose that  is a signed measure. Use the Hahn decomposition theorem to write

where  are both non-negative measures.

Properties

 holds.

The support of a measure is closed in as its complement is the union of the open sets of measure 

In general the support of a nonzero measure may be empty: see the examples below.
 
The converse is true if  is open, but it is not true in general: it fails if there exists a point  such that  (e.g. Lebesgue measure). Thus, one does not need to "integrate outside the support": for any measurable function  or 

The concept of support of a measure and that of spectrum of a self-adjoint linear operator on a Hilbert space are closely related. Indeed, if  is a regular Borel measure on the line  then the multiplication operator  is self-adjoint on its natural domain 
 
and its spectrum coincides with the essential range of the identity function  which is precisely the support of

Examples

Lebesgue measure

In the case of Lebesgue measure  on the real line  consider an arbitrary point  Then any open neighbourhood  of  must contain some open interval  for some  This interval has Lebesgue measure  so  Since  was arbitrary,

Dirac measure

In the case of Dirac measure  let  and consider two cases:
 if  then every open neighbourhood  of  contains  so 
 on the other hand, if  then there exists a sufficiently small open ball  around  that does not contain  so 
We conclude that  is the closure of the singleton set  which is  itself.

A uniform distribution

Consider the measure  on the real line  defined by

i.e. a uniform measure on the open interval  A similar argument to the Dirac measure example shows that  Note that the boundary points 0 and 1 lie in the support: any open set containing 0 (or 1) contains an open interval about 0 (or 1), which must intersect  and so must have positive -measure.

A nontrivial measure whose support is empty

The space of all countable ordinals with the topology generated by "open intervals" is a locally compact Hausdorff space. The measure ("Dieudonné measure") that assigns measure 1 to Borel sets containing an unbounded closed subset  and assigns 0 to other Borel sets is a Borel probability measure whose support is empty.

A nontrivial measure whose support has measure zero

On a compact Hausdorff space the support of a non-zero measure is always non-empty, but may have measure  An example of this is given by adding the first uncountable ordinal  to the previous example: the support of the measure is the single point  which has measure

References

 
   (See chapter 2, section 2.)
 (See chapter 3, section 2)

Measures (measure theory)
Measure theory